Orton is a village and civil parish about  west of Kettering, in North Northamptonshire, England.

The villages name means 'Higher farm/settlement' or 'ridge farm/settlement'.

References

Further reading

Villages in Northamptonshire
Civil parishes in Northamptonshire
North Northamptonshire